Dead Reckoning is a 2020 American action thriller film directed by Andrzej Bartkowiak. The film stars KJ Apa, India Eisley, Scott Adkins and James Remar. It was released on video on demand on November 13, 2020. The film was shot in 2016, under the original title Altar Rock.

Plot
During a picturesque summer on the Nantucket coast, Niko and Tillie are living the dream of a summer romance. However, when Niko's terrorist brother comes to the United States, Niko must pit himself against his own family in order to protect the woman he loves and thousands of innocent people.

Cast
 KJ Apa as Niko
 India Eisley as Tillie Gardner
 Scott Adkins as Marco
 James Remar as Agent Richard Cantrell
 Ellie Cornell as Jennifer Crane
 Sydney Park as Felicity
 Brooks Bowden as Lew
 John Shea as FBI Agent Hanley

References

External links
 
 
 

2020 films
2020 action thriller films
2020 LGBT-related films
2020s English-language films
American action thriller films
Albanian Mafia
Films about terrorism
Films set in Nantucket
Films shot in Massachusetts
Films set on islands
Films directed by Andrzej Bartkowiak
Independence Day (United States) films
2020s American films